Atomic Monster is an American film and television production company, founded in 2014 by James Wan. The company is known for producing films in The Conjuring Universe, Lights Out, Mortal Kombat, Malignant and M3GAN.

Overview
On October 21, 2014, James Wan launched Atomic Monster, which oversees the development and production of budget films. It was also announced that the company has made a first-look producing deal with New Line Cinema and Warner Bros. Pictures. The first films produced by the company include Annabelle, The Conjuring 2, Lights Out, Annabelle: Creation and The Nun.

On August 12, 2016, the company reached a development deal with Chinese company Starlight Culture Entertainment Group to help finance Wan's films with budgets up to $100 million.

On October 5, 2018, Halloween-themed event Horror Made Here: A Festival of Frights at Warner Bros. Studio Tour Hollywood featured a maze based on The Conjuring Universe. In 2023, their film M3GAN will be featured at Universal's Halloween Horror Nights.

On November 16, 2022, it was announced that the company was in talks to merge with Jason Blum's Blumhouse Productions with the company having a shared first-look deal with Universal Pictures, thus ending their deal with Warner Bros. Pictures. The companies would continue to operate as separate labels, with each maintaining its own creative autonomy and brand identity. The company is utilizing the existing Blumhouse infrastructure to further scale their activities in film, television and new content areas, such as horror-related video games, live entertainment and audio.

Filmography

Films

Upcoming films

In development

Canceled films

Television series

TV series

In development

References

Mass media companies established in 2014
Film production companies of the United States